The Venezuelan Zinga Son, Vol. 1 is an album released by Venezuelan band Los Amigos Invisibles in 2002 (Long Lost Brother Records) and 2004 (Luaka Bop). It was produced by "Little" Louie Vega and Kenny "Dope" González of Masters at Work, except track #13, produced by Dimitri from Paris.

Track listing
Venezuelan edition (Released 2003)
"Rico Pa' Goza'"
"Comodón Johnson"
"Una Disco Llena"
"Venezuelan Zinga Son"
"Playa Azul"
"Ease Your Mind"
"Isyormain"
"Gerundio"
"Ojos Cerrando"
"Esto Es Lo Que Hay"
"Majunche"
"Mambo Chimbo"
"Diablo"
"Calne"
"Superfucker"
"Bruja"
"Las Gorditas De Mario"
+Hidden track, a.k.a. "Comodón Johnson (Reprise)"

U.S. Version (Released June 2004) as an enhanced CD
"Rico Pa' Goza'"
"Comodón Johnson"
"Una Disco Llena"
"Venezuelan Zinga Son"
"Playa Azul"
"Ease Your Mind"
"Isyormain"
"Gerundio"
"Ojos Cerrando"
"Esto Es Lo Que Hay"
"Majunche"
"Mambo Chimbo"
"Diablo"
"Calne"
"Superfucker"
"Bruja"

References

2004 albums
Luaka Bop albums
Los Amigos Invisibles albums